EGPA may refer to:
 ICAO airport code for the Kirkwall Airport
 Eosinophilic granulomatosis with polyangiitis, otherwise known as Churg–Strauss syndrome